Jesse William Richardson (August 18, 1930 – June 17, 1975) was an American collegiate and professional American football player who played defensive lineman in the National Football League for the Philadelphia Eagles, and in the American Football League for the Boston Patriots.  Richardson played college football at the University of Alabama and was drafted in the eighth round of the 1953 NFL Draft.

He was the last lineman to have played without a face mask. He died on June 17, 1975, from kidney disease.

See also
 List of American Football League players

References

External links
 

1930 births
1975 deaths
American football defensive tackles
Alabama Crimson Tide football players
Boston Patriots players
Philadelphia Eagles players
Eastern Conference Pro Bowl players
Players of American football from Philadelphia
American Football League players
Deaths from kidney disease